Petteri Lindbohm (born September 23, 1993 in Vantaa, Finland) is a Finnish professional ice hockey defenceman currently playing for Frölunda HC of the Swedish Hockey League (SHL). He has previously played with Lausanne HC and EHC Biel of the National League (NL), Jokerit of the Kontinental Hockey League (KHL), and with the St. Louis Blues and Florida Panthers of the National Hockey League (NHL). The Blues selected him in the 6th round (176th overall) of the 2012 NHL Entry Draft.

Playing career
Lindbohm played in his native Finnish Liiga during the 2012–13 and 2013–14 seasons. On March 21, 2014, he signed a three-year, entry-level deal with the St. Louis Blues.

In the 2014–15 season, his first in North America, Lindbohm primarily played with the Blues' AHL affiliate Chicago Wolves, appearing in 53 games. Lindbohm also skated in 23 games for the Blues, scoring two goals and 3 points. Lindbohm scored his first career NHL goal on February 20, 2015, in a 5-1 victory over the Boston Bruins.

On September 11, 2017, the Blues re-signed Lindbohm as a restricted free agent to a one-year, two-way contract. He was re-assigned to continue his tenure with the Chicago Wolves in the 2017–18 season.

On July 27, 2018, as a restricted free agent from the Blues, Lindbohm left North America and signed a one-year contract in Switzerland worth CHF 700,000 with Lausanne HC of the National League (NL). Right after winning gold with Finland at the 2019 IIHF World Championship, Lausanne signed Lindbohm to a one-year contract extension worth CHF 750,000. On May 20, 2020, Lausanne HC announced that Lindbohm would not return to the team for the 2020–21 season.

On July 30, 2020, Lindbohm agreed to a one-year contract with EHC Biel to remain in the National League for the 2020–21 season.

Following his third season in the NL, Lindbohm left as a free agent and returned to his original club, Jokerit, now of the KHL, on a two-year agreement on May 5, 2021. In the 2021–22 season, Lindbohm playing in a top-four shutdown role registered three goals and 8 points from the blueline, helping Jokerit to a second place finish in the regular season.

With Jokerit withdrawing from the KHL playoffs, Lindbohm was released from his contract as a free agent and returned to the NHL in agreeing to a one-year, $750,000 contract with the Florida Panthers for the remainder of the  season on March 1, 2022.

As a free agent from the Panthers, Lindbohm returned to Europe and agreed on a one-year contract to play with his first Swedish club, Frölunda HC of the SHL, on August 2, 2022.

International play

Lindbohm first represented Finland on the international stage at the 2011 IIHF World U18 Championships before later captaining the junior squad at the 2013 World Junior Ice Hockey Championships.

He made his senior debut with Finland, claiming gold at the 2019 IIHF World Championship in Slovakia and the Silver medal in the 2021 IIHF World Championship in Riga, Latvia. He was named to the Finnish Olympic team at the 2022 Winter Olympics held in Beijing, China. He registered two assists through 6 games helping Finland capture an historic first Olympic Gold Medal, following a 2-1 victory over the Russian Olympic Committee.

Career statistics

Regular season and playoffs

International

References

External links

1993 births
Living people
Finnish ice hockey defencemen
Ässät players
EHC Biel players
Chicago Wolves players
Florida Panthers players
Frölunda HC players
Jokerit players
Kiekko-Vantaa players
Lausanne HC players
Ice hockey players at the 2022 Winter Olympics
Medalists at the 2022 Winter Olympics
Olympic ice hockey players of Finland
Olympic gold medalists for Finland
Olympic medalists in ice hockey
St. Louis Blues draft picks
St. Louis Blues players
Ice hockey people from Helsinki